The Patton Home is a historic building and low-income housing facility in Portland, Oregon, United States. It was once known as the Patton Home for the Friendless.  It was listed on the National Register of Historic Places in 2021.

History
The building, originally used as a retirement home, was built in 1890 on Michigan Avenue in the Albina district of Portland. Matthew Patton, who arrived in Oregon in 1847, donated the land for use as a home for the aged. Since its opening, the Patton Home has served the Albina neighborhood of north Portland for over 100 years. The Patton Home offers shelter and care for those in need.

During the late 1990s, the Patton Home was purchased by the Ecumenical Ministries of Oregon (EMO) who then invested $6 million in renovating the building in order to briefly operate the Patton Home as a residential care facility before EMO transitioned the facility to serve as a specialized drug- and alcohol-free living environment for low-income individuals.

The grounds of the Patton Home occupy the whole block of Michigan Avenue and are located on the east side of Interstate 5. The Patton Home currently provides housing to 63 low-income residents. The grounds also contain a veranda for socializing and a community garden.

References

Residential buildings in Portland, Oregon
1890 establishments in Oregon
National Register of Historic Places in Portland, Oregon